Frog Baseball is an animated short film created by Mike Judge in 1992, which marks the first appearance of the Beavis and Butt-Head characters. It premiered in The Sick and Twisted Festival of Animation.

Plot
The short starts out with a title card that says "Inbred Jed's Homemade Cartoons", with the character of Inbred Jed staring at the camera and cackling. Two teenagers by the name of Beavis and Butt-Head are shown switching channels on their TV, watching TV commercials and laughing at a Suzanne Somers Thighmaster commercial. Later, while blowing up insects with firecrackers in a field, Beavis and Butt-Head spot a frog and exclaim "frog baseball!"; they then proceed to play baseball with the frog. After they kill the frog, they see a poodle and charge after the dog with a baseball bat, exclaiming "dog baseball!". The credits roll as the viewer hears the duo hit the poodle with a bat and the poodle yelping in pain (not seen).

DVD 
It is available on Disc 3 of Volume 3 of The Mike Judge Collection and on the Mike Judge's Most Wanted DVD as a special feature. It is also slightly edited from the MTV  broadcast and the Liquid TV version. It is more on par with the Spike & Mike's Sick and Twisted Festival of Animation airing. The end title card that showed a still from the cartoon in which Butt-head's bat made contact with Beavis' head and reads "No animals were harmed in the making of this film... except for Beavis" is removed from the DVD version. It instead shows the original disclaimer “No animals were harmed in the making of this film” leaving out the Beavis part, like in the liquid TV version and the MTV TV version.

Cultural references
The duo play Black Sabbath's "Iron Man" and Deep Purple's "Smoke on the Water" on air guitar.

The short, along with the episode "Held Back", was also mentioned in the Beavis and Butt-Head episode "Snitchers", the 20th episode of the 8th season. The way the duo scream "FROG BASEBALL!" in the short was also used in a music video commentary in "Give Blood".

External links

References

1992 films
1992 animated films
1992 American television episodes
1992 short films
1990s American animated films
1990s animated short films
American television series premieres
Beavis and Butt-Head episodes
Films about animal cruelty
Films about frogs
American baseball films
Fictional ball games
American animated short films
Films directed by Mike Judge
Films with screenplays by Mike Judge
Television films as pilots